Chinta may refer to:

 Chinta (mentation), a Sanskrit word that refers to mental activity
 Chinta (film), a 1948 Singaporean romantic drama film
 Chinta Valley, a tourist destination in Jammu.  There is a village on the hills above the valley called "Chinta".  The stream through the valley is the "Chinta Nallah".